Suleyman`s Eagle, a bronze figure of an eagle, is one of the symbols Ingushetia. It was made at the end of the 8th century in the Arab Caliphate and was found in the 19th century in the village of Erzi of the Republic of Ingushetia.

In 1931 it was taken out by well-known scholars of Caucasian N. F. Yakovlev and St. Petersburg, which is exhibited in the hall of the culture and art of the East Hermitage. Before nationalization and transfer to the museum it belonged to the Ingush teip - Yand-nakan (Yandiev), who used it as their coat of arms.

Statuette height 38 cm, made of bronze, clearly transmitting plastic eagle and his menacing, graceful appearance. Hollow inside and could be used as a receptacle. Inlaid with silver and copper. In the neck engraved in Arabic: «في اسم الرحمن الرحيم, الله الرحيم», translated into English saying: 'In the Name of Allah, Most Gracious, Most Merciful. " On the opposite side of the embossed name of the master manufacturer, "Suleiman" and the date of manufacture - 189 Hijra year (equivalent to 796–797 years. Gregorian calendar).

The official website of the Hermitage specified that the information about the place of manufacture of figurines can not be read, but the scientific community is widely believed that this relic is made in Basra (now The Republic of Iraq) - a cultural and crafts centers of the Arab Caliphate.

In the world survived three more similar in shape figurines (in Museum of Islamic Art (Berlin), in the city of Lucca in Italy and in Saint Catherine's Monastery in Egypt), but only on a copy that is stored in the "Hermitage" the date of manufacture, and perhaps it is the oldest of the four curved vessels.

March 17, 2013 at the State Hermitage Museum held a solemn ceremony of handing over copies of the "Suleiman`s Eagle" the State Museum of the Republic of Ingushetia.

External links
 Page of the exhibit "Eagle Suleiman" on the official website of the State Hermitage Museum (Russia)
 Reports of TV channel "Russia-24" - "Eagle Suleiman in Ingushetia"
 The article "The symbol of Ingushetia has returned home" on the website of the newspaper "Komsomolskaya pravda"

Figurines